Karl Landauer (12 October 1887 – 27 January 1945) was a German psychoanalyst and co-founder of the first Frankfurt Psychoanalytic Institute. He died of starvation in the Bergen-Belsen concentration camp in Lower Saxony, a German state in northwestern Germany.

Early life 
 
Landauer was born in 1887 into a Jewish banking family in Munich. At the age of 13 his father died. As the only son he took over the religious duties as the head of the family. After graduating from the Wilhelmsgymnasium Munich in 1906, he completed a medical degree (in Freiburg and in Berlin) and undertook training as a specialist in neuropathy at the Munich University Hospital led by Emil Kraepelin. In 1912 he went to Vienna to complete analytic training with Freud and to practice at the psychiatric clinic of Wagner-Jauregg. He dealt mainly with psychosis and the issues of narcissism and made significant contributions to the psychoanalysis of affect formation.

Career 
After the First World War, Landauer became a pacifist. In 1916, he fell ill with typhus and was subsequently transferred to a military prison in Heilbronn as a doctor. There he met and married Lins Kahn.

After the war, he settled and ran a private practice in Frankfurt am Main c.1923. He became friends with Max Horkheimer. The Frankfurt Psychoanalytical Institute (now the Sigmund Freud Institute), co-founded by Landauer, cooperated with Horkheimer's Institute for Social Research, in whose rooms he had guest status. In 1933 both facilities were closed. Landauer could have fled to Sweden, but instead settled in the Netherlands, where he worked as a training analyst.

After the Netherlands came under Nazi occupation, he received a professional ban in 1942 and was arrested in 1943. In February 1944 he was deported to the Bergen-Belsen concentration camp together with his wife and eldest daughter, where he died of starvation in January 1945. Both his wife and daughter, Eva Landauer, survived the concentration camp. Two of Landauer's younger children were able to avoid arrest.

On the occasion of the 100th anniversary of Goethe University, a Stolperstein, (a 'stumbling stone monument'), was laid to commemorate him on 17 October 2014 at Savignystraße 76.

Publications 
 Spontanheilung einer Katatonie. Zeitschrift für ärztliche Psychoanalyse 2 (1914), 441–459
 Passive Technik: Zur Analyse narzißtischer Erkrankungen. Internationale Zeitschrift für Psychoanalyse 10 (1924), 415–422
 Die Affekte und ihre Entwicklung. Imago 22 (1936), 275–291
 Theorie der Affekte und andere Schriften zur Ich-Organisation. Hg. von HJ Rothe. Frankfurt/Main (Fischer) 1991

Literature   

 Elke Mühlleitner: Biographisches Lexikon der Psychoanalyse. Die Mitglieder der Psychologischen Mittwoch-Gesellschaft und der Wiener Psychoanalytischen Vereinigung 1902–1938. Tübingen 1992.
 HJ Rothe: Ein exemplarisches Schicksal: Karl Landauer (1887–1945). In: Tomas Plänkers et al.: Psychoanalyse in Frankfurt am Main. Tübingen 1996, S. 87–108.

References

External links 
 Literature by and about Karl Landauer in the catalog of the German National Library

1887 births
1945 deaths
People educated at the Wilhelmsgymnasium (Munich)
German psychoanalysts
Jewish psychoanalysts
German people who died in Bergen-Belsen concentration camp
German pacifists
German Jews who died in the Holocaust
Deaths by starvation